Makutano Junction is a Kenyan soap opera that premiered in 2006. It captures different themes that affect the normal African society. The main contemporary issues that are mostly stressed in the drama are, corruption, education, early marriages, Female Genital Mutilation and pregnancies, HIV/AIDS, human rights, social justice, values, and perceptions, conflict resolution. The story is set on a fictional village named Makutano and has an ensemble cast.

Production

Production crew
The show is produced by David Campbell and Naomi Kamau. The series has had different directors and writers who dedicate to different episodes and seasons. The first director was Andrew Gosling. Shani Grewal directed 39 episodes of the show.  Mary Migui, Salome Kinyanjui and Omfwoko Aswani were also directors at some point in the television series. Philip Luswata, also playing a main role in the teledrama, is the primary scriptwriter. Other writers were Morrison Mwadulo, Natasha Likimani, Charles Ouda, Damaris Irungu, Patrick Serro and Wanjiru Kairu. Official production of this television series was started in 2005.

Filming
The first nine seasons were shot in standard and were framed at 4:3 aspect ratio. Subsequent seasons have had 16:9 widescreen. Each season is set to have 13 episodes each. The first season was released in the same year and issues such as Human Rights, Social Justice, Values and Perceptions, Conflict Resolution, Sustainable Development, interdependency among more were showcased.
In series two of Makutano, Living with HIV/AIDS social justice were the key issues.
In the third season, human rights, diversity values and perceptions were the key issues that were put into play. The fourth season—that ran for the usual 13-episode run—had all the previous themes combined one key issue that was included women leadership and the challenges they face. This made Regina Rè as the central character of the season. Down to the thirteenth season, women banking had its fly as it encouraged women to consider saving their money for financial security. The 2015-2016 season will cover the topics: tracking education for children, improving education in schools through teacher and parent participation, women's empowerment and agribusiness entrepreneurship. The season will premiere on 14 October 2015 at Citizen TV.

Premise
Makutano Junction spans through different families in Makutano Village. For every normal village there must be a saga. Hence Makutano Village, may not be out of a norm. Cases such as corruption, health issues, empowerment of women, domestic violence which are common in most parts of developing nations, thus ways of tackling such cases are showcased in the story. For instance one gets to meet a select of family members like The Mabukis, who are headed by Winston Mabuki. He is a respectable man in his mid sixties. Married to an ambitious woman Priscilla and they have one son, Karis who has a daughter (a product of their teenage romance) with Hope Baraka but never got married, an ex-convict that demands fear from the rest of the village. The series also features a family that have members suffering from HIV/AIDS. The HIV/AIDS is mainly showcased by Margaret who does not hide her status and lives a normal life without infecting her loving husband Matano, the Makutano chief. They even conceive a daughter who is born healthy. It is The Okodis, in which Mama Mboga has to fight stigmatization and endure the abuse he receives from her husband Erasmus Okodi. The story also features political ventures of various characters and the challenges they face especially women. At one point, Hope Baraka vies for parliamentary elections where she faces discrimination among men and conservative members of society. Moreover, family and marital problems are also depicted in the storyline. For example, Hannington Baraka shares a very distant relationship with his youngest son Philip, who only seeks for his father to look at his good side and support his decisions no matter how rushed they are sometimes. Love is also represented in the show, for instance the great love that Philip has for Red.

Cast

Regular cast

The Mabukis
Raymond Ofula as Winston Mabuki
Mukami Njiru as Priscilla Mabuki
Maqbul Mohammed as Karis
Alfred Munyua as Vincent Mabuki
Ainea Ojiambo as Snake

The Barakas
 Joseph Omari as Hannington Baraka
Margaret Aketch as Bernadette Baraka
Onyango Owino as Maspeedy
Regina Re as Hope Baraka
Charles Ouda  as Philip Baraka
Patricia Kihoro as Diana Baraka
Mungai Mbaya as Brian Baraka

The Mulanis
Jim Were as Jonathan Mulani
Salome Kinyanjui as Rose Mulani
Beatrice Wangechi as Kara Mulani
Emily Wanja as Red Mulani
Kamau Mbaya  as Tobby Mulani

The Mukaras
Uncornfirmed actor as Leonard
Lizz Njagah as Nancy Mukara
Angela Ndambuki as Nancy #2 (Season 2 only)
Peter Nzioki as Albert Mukara

The Okodis
Naomi Kamau as Mama Mboga
Cajetan Boy as Erasmus Okodi
Uncornfirmed actor as Peggy Okodi
Uncornfirmed actor as Mari Okodi
Uncornfirmed actor as Joni Okodi (baby)

Barbers and Hairdressers

Barbers
Frobisher Lwanga as Dodgy D
Abubakar Mwenda as Bill
Jeff Shigoli as Ben

The Matanos
Philip Luswata as Matano
Caroline Midimo as Margaret
Asha Mwikali as Everlyn

Hairdressers
Lucia Shikuku as "Big" Sharon
Wanjiku Mburu as "Small" Sharon
Wanja Mworia as Toni
Janet Kirina as Florence

The Matendecheres
Morrison Mwadulo as Josiah
Louisa Sialo as Ana
Pascal Tokodi as Thomas
Triza Kabue as Lena

Other cast
Damaris Irungu as Pendo
Tonny Njuguna as Dr. Charles
Patrick Serro as Washington
Charles Bukeko as Matata
Lucy Njoroge as Bettina
Katherine Damaris as Mama Pima
Natasha Likimani as Catherine A.K.A Kate
Joed Ngaruiya as Shani
 Ngwatilo Mawiyoo as Lilian
Isaac Muwawu as Joseph Matata
Nungari Kang'ethe as Mrs. Matata
Mbeki Mwalimu as Dr. Hannah Wasali
Justin Mirichii as Elvis Kipmau
Joan Samia as Stella
Henry Njenga as Henri Drani
Malcolm Mwakazi as Steve
Kenneth Ambani as Shaka
Gloria Moraa as Yvonne
Faith Nyanga as Letisha
Gitura Kamau as K.K
Samantha Wanjiru as Peninah
Allan Weku as Frankie
Irene Kariuki as Mercy
Diana Kamau as Hellen

Broadcast
Since its premiere, Makutano Junction has been broadcast all over East Africa. In Kenya it recorded regular viewership of 7 million viewers by 2013, making it the most watched local program in the country. In Tanzania, it recorded average viewership of 2 million viewers and a viewership rating of 3 million in Uganda.

Series overview

References

External links

2007 Kenyan television series debuts
English-language television shows
Swahili-language television shows
Kenyan television soap operas
2000s Kenyan television series
2010s Kenyan television series
Kenya Broadcasting Corporation original programming